There are a number of National Museums in the United Kingdom, which are owned and operated by the state. The national museums of the UK are funded by the Department for Culture, Media and Sport (DCMS) of the United Kingdom government, and are all located in England. There are 14 national museums, all established by Acts of Parliament, as well as another eight which are sponsored by the DCMS.

In addition, there are national museums in Scotland, Wales and Northern Ireland, which are supported by the devolved legislatures. National museums in Scotland are funded by the Scottish Executive Education Department, in Wales by the Welsh Government, and in Northern Ireland by the Department of Culture, Arts and Leisure of the Northern Ireland Executive.

Free entrance is standard practice in all UK National Museums, although some exhibits do require an admission fee to view. Several of the museums have more than one location throughout the UK.

National Museums in England

National museums established by Act of Parliament 
 British Museum, London
 Imperial War Museums, London, Cambridge and Manchester
 National Gallery, London
 National Maritime Museum, London
 National Museums Liverpool
 World Museum, Liverpool
 Walker Art Gallery, Liverpool
 Merseyside Maritime Museum, Liverpool
 Seized! The Border and Customs uncovered, Liverpool
 International Slavery Museum, Liverpool
 Lady Lever Art Gallery, Port Sunlight
 Sudley House, Liverpool
 Museum of Liverpool, Liverpool
 Science Museum Group
Science Museum, London
 Science and Industry Museum, Manchester
 National Railway Museum, York
 National Science and Media Museum, Bradford
 National Collections Centre, Swindon
 Locomotion, Shildon
 National Portrait Gallery, London
 National Army Museum, Chelsea, London
 Natural History Museum, London
 Royal Armouries, Leeds, London and Portsmouth
 Sir John Soane's Museum, London
 Tate, London, Liverpool and St. Ives, Cornwall
 Victoria and Albert Museum, London
 Wallace Collection, London

Sponsored museums
 Geffrye Museum, London
 Horniman Museum and Gardens, London
 
 National Coal Mining Museum for England, Overton, West Yorkshire

National Museums in Scotland

National Museums in Wales

National Museums in Northern Ireland 
 Ulster Museum
 Ulster Folk & Transport Museum
 Ulster American Folk Park
 Armagh County Museum

See also 
List of museums in England
List of museums in Scotland
List of museums in Wales
List of museums in Northern Ireland

References

External links
 Department for Culture, Media and Sport: Museums and galleries
 National Museums Scotland
 National Museum Wales
 National Museums Northern Ireland